Călărași is a commune in Dolj County, Oltenia, Romania with a population of 6,576 people. It is composed of two villages, Călărași and Sărata.

References

Communes in Dolj County
Localities in Oltenia